Yuri Komura (born January 30, 1992) is a Japanese ice hockey player for Toyota Cygnus and the Japanese national team. She participated at the 2015 IIHF Women's World Championship.

References

1992 births
Living people
Japanese women's ice hockey goaltenders